Thipparalli Tharlegalu is a 2010 Indian Kannada-language film directed by Rajendra Singh Babu starring Ambareesh, Komal, S. Narayan, Om Prakash Rao and Brinda Parekh in lead roles. The film was released on 2 April 2010 alongside Premism and Satya.

Cast

 Ambareesh as Kanwarlal
 Komal as Pandu 
 S. Narayan as Nany 
 Om Prakash Rao as Pandu 
 Brinda Parekh
 Sadhu Kokila
 Bullet Prakash
 Suresh Chandra as Minister Hanumanthappa 
 Girija Lokesh 
 Pooja Kanwal
 Doddanna as Halkatti
 Sundar Raj 
 Umashree 
 Giribale Rekha
 Joe Simon
 Siddaraj Kalyankar
 Nataraj
 Vaswani
 Master Arun
 Dharma
 Tanya (special appearance in "Kannalle Kannalle")

Production 
Ambareesh reprises his role of Kanwarlal from Antha (1981) in this film. According to the director, Ambareesh makes a cameo in the film.

Soundtrack

Reception

Critical response 

Shruti Indira Lakshminarayana from Rediff.com scored the film at 1 out of 5 stars and says "The film raises questions such as, "Is politics just about publicity and money? Is it only bullets that do the talking in the field? The film in short speaks of the death of democracy that we are witnessing. If only the theme was backed by punchy dialogues and dry humour! Babu, who has given films Kurigalu Sir Kurigalu, disappoints this time. Thipparalli Tharlegalu is a letdown". A critic from The New Indian Express wrote "It is a pity to see a director like Rajendra Babu offering a stale flick that has nothing to offer the audience except for long and boring speeches. The much-publicised Kanwarlal character also fails to offer a relief to the audience". A critic from Bangalore Mirror wrote  "A higher level of comedy and satire is required for a film like this. Make sure the AC is working and seats are very comfortable in the cinema hall. A couple of hours rest is good on a hot summer day".

References

2010s Kannada-language films
2010 films